Pulsing may refer to:

 Pulsing (bodywork)
 Pulse (signal processing)